Redeployment is a collection of short stories by American writer Phil Klay. His first published book, it won the 2014 National Book Award for Fiction and the National Book Critics Circle's 2014 John Leonard Award given for a best first book in any genre.

Background
The book consists of twelve stories that chronicle the experiences of soldiers and veterans who served during the Iraq War, specifically Operation Iraqi Freedom (2003 – 2010). Klay served in the United States Marine Corps from 2005 to 2009. He was deployed to the Anbar Province in 2007–8.

Klay has said that before and during his service in Iraq he did not have a "clear sense" that he was going to write about war, but that when he shared his plan to enter the military upon graduation, his Dartmouth College teacher and mentor, the American poet Tom Sleigh:

Klay spent four years writing Redeployment. The book's title story first appeared in the literary magazine Granta. It was reprinted in Fire and Forget: Short Stories from the Long War, an anthology of war fiction. Klay has stated that the process of writing the stories that became Redeployment involved years of meticulous research.

Klay has described his own deployment in Iraq as "a mild experience" where he did not see the war itself but only the effects of war second hand. To depict the war, he created a dozen characters, each with a different set of experiences and perspectives. Avoiding cliches and creating "prototypes", he has said, "was something I took very seriously. I did a lot a research, I talked to a lot of Marines, and spent a lot of time thinking about the subjects. Doing the kind of imaginative work, drafting stories over and over again until I had something that felt emotionally honest, which is also not the same as something that's going to please everyone who’s been through that experience." He said he needed multiples voices because:

He said he had some models in mind of what he did not want to do: "There have been a couple books in the last couple years with almost comical misrepresentations of the military by authors who wanted to talk about Iraq, but clearly didn't want to do the hard work of learning enough about the subject to have something worth saying." Klay included in Redeployment a list of works he read and found valuable in helping to shape his writing. He explained that:

Contents

Reception
Redeployment was published in March 2014. In the New York Times, Dexter Filkins wrote: "It's the best thing written so far on what the war did to people’s souls." In The Guardian, Edward Docx wrote:

Writing in the Daily Beast, Brian Castner described the book "a clinic in the profanities of war". He wrote:

On November 19, Redeployment received the 2014 National Book Award for fiction. The judges described it as a "brutal, piercing sometimes darkly funny collection" that "stakes Klay's claim for consideration as the quintessential storyteller of America's Iraq conflict." In his acceptance speech, he said: "I can't think of a more important conversation to be having — war's too strange to be processed alone. I want to thank everyone who picked up the book, who read it and decided to join the conversation." National Public Radio reported that:

The New York Times included Redeployment on its list of the "Ten Best Books of 2014". On January 19, 2015 it was announced by the National Book Critics Circle that Redeployment received its 2014 John Leonard Award for "a best first book published in any genre."

In May 2015 The Chautauqua Institute announced that Redeployment won the 2015 Chautauqua Prize. The Chautauqua Prize is awarded annually to commemorate a book of fiction or literary/narrative nonfiction that provides a richly rewarding reading experience and honors the author for a significant contribution to the literary arts.

In June 2015, the American Library Association announced that Klay's Redeployment was the 2015 recipient of the W. Y. Boyd Literary Award for Excellence in Military Fiction. In November 2015, Redeployment was awarded the Warwick Prize for Writing for 2015.

References

2014 short story collections
American short story collections
National Book Award for Fiction winning works
Military fiction
Penguin Press books